Andrena apacheorum is a species of mining bee in the family Andrenidae. The species resides in Central America and North America.

References

Further reading

 
 

apacheorum
Articles created by Qbugbot
Insects described in 1897